Ezo is a town in South Sudan. The town had a population of 33,657 as of 2008.
The town is on the border with the Democratic Republic of Congo and close to the tripoint of both countries with the Central African Republic. It is the seat of an Anglican bishopric.

References

Populated places in Western Equatoria